Diapers.com was an online specialty retailer for baby products from 2005 to 2017. It was founded by Marc Lore and Vinit Bharara in Montclair, New Jersey. Initially named 1800DIAPERS, the company set out delivering consumables, such as diapers, wipes, and formula. It used Kiva robots for warehouse automation and a combination of UPS Ground and FedEx delivery. In late 2008, Diapers.com expanded its selection of baby products, including clothes, car seats, strollers, and toys.

Diapers.com was ranked #35 overall, #1 for Retail, #3 in NY-NJ-PA, and  #5 Top Indian Run Companies by Inc. magazine in 2009.

Amazon.com acquired parent Quidsi, Inc. for $545 million on November 8, 2010. The company's headquarters were located at Exchange Place in Jersey City, New Jersey.

In March 2017, Amazon.com announced the shutdown of Diapers.com and all other Quidsi sites as of April 19, 2017, due to lack of profitability. On April 20, 2017,  Quidsi.com, Diapers.com, Soap.com, Wag.com, BeautyBar.com, Casa.com, and YoYo.com were relocated to Amazon.com, and were available at their former URLs. These URLs no longer work.

History 
Marc Lore and Vinit Bharara started Diapers.com in 2005. At launch, the company sold diapers, targeting mothers with children up to age 3. In its first year, the company sold $2.5 million in diapers and formula.

Lore and Bharara opened a formal office in Montclair, New Jersey, in 2006, and the following year hired their first full-time employee. 

Originally created as 1800Diapers in 2005, the company later became Diapers.com and expanded to include Soap.com as well as other sites under the parent company Quidsi, Inc. Diapers, Inc. changed its name to Quidsi in 2009. Amazon.com acquired Quidsi, Inc. for $545 million on November 8, 2010. However, it continued to operate independently and follow an integration model similar to the one Amazon uses with Zappos.com until April 2017.

References

External links
 Diapers.com

Companies based in Hudson County, New Jersey
Retail companies established in 2005
Retail companies disestablished in 2017
Internet properties established in 2005
Internet properties disestablished in 2017
Online retailers of the United States
Diapers
Amazon (company) acquisitions
2010 mergers and acquisitions
Defunct American websites